Stenoscaptia bipartita is a moth in the subfamily Arctiinae first described by Rothschild in 1913. It is found in New Guinea.

References

Lithosiini